Anthony Senter and Joseph Testa, better known as the Gemini twins, are two mobsters in the Lucchese crime family. Senter and Testa are former members of the DeMeo crew in the Gambino crime family. In 1989, both Senter and Testa were found guilty of racketeering and 10 counts of murder, and each was sentenced to life in federal prison.

Early life

Anthony Michael Senter was born in Canarsie, Brooklyn, New York, to immigrants Michael Senter (Northern Italian) and wife from Rovereto, Italy. The original family name was "Sente", but was later anglicized to "Senter". His uncle, Gambino and Colombo associate, Robert Senter, owned the Canarsie Recycling Company in Canarsie. As a young man Anthony worked at both his father's small debris removal business and his uncle's sanitation company. Robert Senter gained notoriety for the kidnapping and murder of Emanuel Gambino, the nephew of Gambino crime family boss Carlo Gambino and nephew of Paul Castellano.

On December 4, 1972, Robert Senter was arrested and confessed to the murder of Gambino. He also revealed the identities of Rickard Nilsson and Warren Schurman who were his two accomplices. On June 1, 1973, Robert pleaded guilty to manslaughter and was sentenced to fifteen years in prison. After his release Robert was murdered by Colombo crime family associates from Brooklyn on orders from Colombo crime family capo John Matera. Anthony Senter married an Italian-American woman on July 24, 1977, at a catering hall in Canarsie, Brooklyn. The wedding was attended by many criminals including Gambino crime family member Roy DeMeo.

Joseph Carmine Testa was born in 1955 in the United States. Testa was one of nine children born to a transport truck driver and a housewife. His brother Patrick Testa also became a mobster, joining the DeMeo crew.

Gemini twins
Growing up, Anthony Senter became close friends with Joseph Testa. When Testa was fifteen, a thirteen-year-old neighbor was mugged by a knife-wielding Puerto Rican man from East New York. The assault victim complained to Testa, who gathered Senter among others and led the group in a borrowed car, spending the day searching for the assailant. In 1973, Testa was nearly killed in a bar fight with a Puerto Rican opponent, when the assailant's knife punctured his lung. Senter hunted down the Puerto Rican and nearly beat him to death with his fists.

By 1970, at the age of 15, Senter had already been convicted of auto theft three times. Testa and Senter had all of their cases dismissed because they were juveniles at the time.  Testa and Senter eventually became known as the "Gemini Twins," because they were always together, and the primary hangout of the DeMeo crew was the Gemini Lounge.

DeMeo crew
Chris Rosenberg hired Senter and Testa to wax his Corvette and Porsche and steal cars for him. Rosenberg introduced his friends Senter and Testa to Roy DeMeo, who asked them to join his crew. DeMeo, Rosenberg, Senter and Testa became the core of the DeMeo crew, and became notorious for their ruthless violence. The crew was suspected to be involved in 75 to 200 murders throughout the mid-1970s and into the 1980s. Senter gained a reputation for providing the crew with significant revenue from auto theft. Although Senter was a large earner for the Gemini Lounge crew, he was highly disliked by Albert DeMeo, the son of Roy DeMeo. Albert's personal judgment of Senter was that "there was something slick and phony about him". DeMeo publicly executed college student Dominick Ragucci on April 19, 1979 after mistaking him for a Cuban hitman and the crew subsequently went into hiding, with Senter and Testa fleeing to California. After the murder of Rosenberg, Joseph Testa became Roy’s right hand man. Chris had previously held that position within the crew.

Murder of DeMeo
On January 10, 1983, Roy DeMeo went to crew member Patrick Testa's bodyshop Patrick Testa Motors Inc. in Canarsie, Brooklyn for a meeting with his men. On January 20, he was found murdered in the trunk of his Cadillac Coupe DeVille, a chandelier placed on top of his body. The car was left abandoned at the Varuna Boat Club parking lot. He had been shot multiple times in the head and had a bullet wound in his hand, assumed by law enforcement to be from throwing his hand up to his face in a self-defense reflex when the shots were fired at him. Anthony Gaggi was originally suspected by law enforcement officials of being the one who killed DeMeo. Gaggi was not charged with the crime.

According to former Lucchese acting boss Anthony Casso, DeMeo was killed at Patrick Testa's Canarsie home by Joseph Testa and Senter following an agreement with Casso, who was given the contract by Gambino crime family Boss Paul Castellano and Frank DeCicco after they were unable to kill DeMeo in the fall of 1982. DeMeo was seated, about to receive coffee, when Testa and Senter opened fire. Anthony Gaggi was not present.

According to Sammy 'The Bull' Gravano, Paul Castellano wanted to have the whole DeMeo crew killed, because they had all turned into serial killers. He gave the contract to John Gotti, who in turn gave it to Frank DeCicco.
Realising how difficult it was going to be, DeCicco went to the Gemini Twins, Testa and Senter, and told them about the contract on them, but promised them that they would get a pass if they killed DeMeo. After DeMeo was hit, the Gambino family kept their word about sparing Senter and Testa, but didn't want them on their books. That's why they were passed to Anthony Casso and the Luccheses. As Sammy said, 'Gaspipe (Casso) was half a fucking nut himself!'.

Move to the Lucchese family
After the murder of Roy DeMeo, Senter and Testa drifted into the Lucchese crime family. According to Casso, they were responsible for the murder on June 13, 1986, of Russian-American gangster Vladimir Reznikov. Reznikov had reportedly threatened the life and family of Marat Balagula, a Ukrainian immigrant who ruled the Russian Mafia in Brighton Beach. Balagula, who was then masterminding a multimillion-dollar gasoline bootlegging operation, had been paying tribute to the Five Families, who regarded him as their biggest moneymaker after drugs.

Arrest and aftermath
On September 14, 1989, Senter and Testa were both sentenced to life imprisonment. Senter continues to serve his sentence at the United States Penitentiary (USP), Allenwood, Pennsylvania. Testa is currently serving his sentence at the Federal Correctional Institute in Terminal Island for crimes that include multiple murders.

In 1994, it was discovered that pension contributions were being paid into a Teamsters pension account in Senter's name by a cousin of Senter, one Dominic Vulpis, who owned a garbage company. A court investigator determined that $30,000 of contributions had been paid into the account over a six-year period while Senter was in prison on a life sentence. Union officials said Senter could have qualified for a pension of $1,400 a month if the payments by Canarsie Recycling had continued for another five years.

Senter will not collect the pension; the Teamsters disqualified Senter as a member and the Pension Fund rejected his pension claim. It is unclear whether Senter's cousin, Dominic Vulpis, or the garbage company he owns received a refund of the fraudulent contributions.

References

Sources

External links
 New York Times:2 in Gambino Family Get Life

American gangsters of Italian descent
Gangsters sentenced to life imprisonment
Lucchese crime family
Living people
Mafia hitmen
DeMeo Crew
1955 births
People from Canarsie, Brooklyn
Gambino crime family
People convicted of racketeering
American people convicted of murder
People convicted of murder by the United States federal government
American prisoners sentenced to life imprisonment
Prisoners sentenced to life imprisonment by the United States federal government